João Galego is a village in the northeastern part of the island of Boa Vista, Cape Verde. Its population was 346 at the 2010 census. The village is around 2 km northwest of Fundo das Figueiras and 19 km east of the island capital of Sal Rei.

See also
List of villages and settlements in Cape Verde

Gallery

References
 

Villages and settlements in Boa Vista, Cape Verde